Roy is a village in Harding County, New Mexico, United States. The population was 234 at the 2010 census.

Roy was a filming location in the 2009 comedy film Did You Hear About the Morgans?.

Geography
Roy is located at  (35.943890, -104.193025).

Demographics

2000 Census
As of the census of 2000, there were 304 people, 150 households, and 88 families residing in the village. The population density was 148.8 people per square mile (57.5/km). There were 206 housing units at an average density of 100.8 per square mile (39.0/km). The racial makeup of the village was 83.22% White, 1.97% Native American, 12.17% from other races, and 2.63% from two or more races. Hispanic or Latino of any race were 52.63% of the population.

There were 150 households, out of which 20.0% had children under the age of 18 living with them, 45.3% were married couples living together, 10.0% had a female householder with no husband present, and 41.3% were non-families. 38.0% of all households were made up of individuals, and 24.0% had someone living alone who was 65 years of age or older. The average household size was 2.03 and the average family size was 2.67.

In the village, the population was spread out, with 17.8% under the age of 18, 5.3% from 18 to 24, 15.1% from 25 to 44, 27.3% from 45 to 64, and 34.5% who were 65 years of age or older. The median age was 52 years. For every 100 females, there were 96.1 males. For every 100 females age 18 and over, there were 98.4 males.

The median income for a household in the village was $21,111, and the median income for a family was $41,667. Males had a median income of $31,250 versus $20,179 for females. The per capita income for the village was $17,651. About 11.7% of families and 15.2% of the population were below the poverty line, including 25.0% of those under the age of eighteen and 13.7% of those 65 or over.

Gallery

Notable person
 Tommy McDonald, American football wide receiver

References

External links

Villages in Harding County, New Mexico
Villages in New Mexico